The Redd on Salmon Street is a "campus" for food businesses and event space in southeast Portland, Oregon's Buckman, in the United States. The $25 million project was started in September 2015 and completed in December 2018.

In 2021, the space was featured on Top Chef: Portland.

Meals 4 Heels is a tenant. Kann Winter Village operated in the parking lot during the COVID-19 pandemic.

References

External links
 The Redd on Salmon Street at Ecotrust

2018 establishments in Oregon
Buckman, Portland, Oregon
Buildings and structures in Portland, Oregon